PL2 may refer to:

 China Railways PL2, one of the industrial locomotives used by China Railway
 Pazmany PL-1 (and PL-2), American two-seat trainer and personal light aircraft
 PL-2, a series of Chinese air-to-air missiles

See also
 PLL (disambiguation)
 PL (disambiguation)